Boronia verecunda is a species of small, erect shrub that is endemic to a small area in the Northern Territory. The flowers are borne singly in leaf axils and are white or pink but turn green as the fruit matures. It is similar to B. xanthastrum.

Description
Its young branchlets are covered with a layer of light pink to white hairs but become glabrous as they age. The sepals and petals do not enlarge significantly as the fruit develops.

Taxonomy and naming
Boronia verecunda was first formally described in 1997 by Marco F. Duretto who published the description in the journal Australian Systematic Botany. The specific epithet (verecunda) is derived from the Latin word verecundus meaning "modest and blushing", referring to the small size of the plant and the colour of the petals and hairs on new growth.

Distribution and habitat
This boronia grows between sandstone rocks and on small scree slopes on sandstone escarpments near the South Alligator River in Kakadu National Park.

Conservation status
This species is classified as "near threatened" under the Territory Parks and Wildlife Conservation Act 2000.

References 

verecunda
Flora of the Northern Territory
Plants described in 1997
Taxa named by Marco Duretto